Stephane Okou  is an Ivorian footballer who plays as a defender. He made his debut for Ivory Coast against Guinea in 2012.

References 

Living people
1991 births
Ivorian footballers
Ivory Coast international footballers
Association football defenders